Khy Taing Lim is the Cambodian Minister for Public Works and Transport. He belongs to Funcinpec and was elected to represent Phnom Penh in the National Assembly of Cambodia in 2003. Lim is of Chinese descent.

References

Cambodian people of Chinese descent
Members of the National Assembly (Cambodia)
FUNCINPEC politicians
Living people
Year of birth missing (living people)